Kajetan Kajetanowicz (born 5 March 1979)  is a Polish rally driver.

Titles

He is a Four time Poland Rally Champion (2010  2011, 2012, 2013). In 2012 he became champion in the Central European Zone Rally Championship.
He also became the ERC European Drivers Champion in the 2015, 2016 and 2017 seasons with co-driver Jarosław Baran in Ford Fiesta R5 driving for Lotos Rally Team

Career Highlights

Since 2013, Kajetanowicz has won six ERC rallies. His first major victory was in 2013, when he won the Rally Poland in a brand-new Ford Fiesta R5 for the Lotos Rally Team. It was Kajetanowicz's third win of the Rally Poland. He would beat previous Polish Rally Champion Bryan Bouffier in a Peugeot 207 S2000 and eventual European champion that season, Jan Kopecký, in a Škoda Fabia S2000. In 2014, Kajetanowicz made the full-time step-up to the ERC, with his rallying team Lotos Rally Team signing a customer support deal with M-Sport Poland. This would supply Kajetanowicz and his team with a factory-prepared Ford Fiesta R5. For the 2014 season, Kajetanowicz ended 4th in the European Championship with two podiums, finishing in third place in the 2014 Acropolis Rally and second place in the Cyprus Rally. In 2015 he won the ERC Drivers title over his main rival for the season, Peugeot factory driver Craig Breen, winning the Jänner Rallye, Cyprus Rally and the Acropolis Rally in the process. In 2016 he successfully defended his ERC title with a win at the Rajd Rzeszowski, three second places (2016 Rally Islas Canarias, 2016 Circuit of Ireland and 2016 Rally Estonia) and a third place at the Rallye Açores. In 2017 he claimed a third consecutive ERC championship with a win at the Acropolis Rally, and taking three second-place finishes at the Canary Islands, Rzeszowski, and Rome. 

After four years of success in the European Championship, Kajetanowicz began the 2018 season with an uncertain future over sponsorship. It wouldn't be until May that his rally team announced a schedule for the 2018 season, with Kajetanowicz set to participate in four rounds of the World Rally Championship in the WRC-2 class. As a result, he would not return to defend his streak of ERC titles.

Career results

WRC results

* Season still in progress.

WRC-2 Results

WRC-3 results

* Season still in progress.

ERC results

References

External links

http://kajto.pl/en?i=10&t=kajetan_kajetanowicz
http://ewrc-results.com/profile.php?p=4113

Living people
1979 births
Polish rally drivers
Intercontinental Rally Challenge drivers
European Rally Championship drivers
Place of birth missing (living people)
21st-century Polish people